Kozojídky is a municipality and village in Hodonín District in the South Moravian Region of the Czech Republic. It has about 500 inhabitants.

Notable people
Karel Benedík (1923–1997), painter

References

Villages in Hodonín District
Moravian Slovakia